Wrong Side Up is a 2005 Czech comedy-drama film written and directed by Petr Zelenka. It is an adaptation of Zelenka's play Tales of Common Insanity. It is a tale of people showing their internal loneliness by their choices in life. It was entered into the 27th Moscow International Film Festival.

Plot
A former aircrew member (Petr) is no longer flying, but works in an aviation-related dead-end job, loading boxes at an air-cargo company.  He spends his working hours dreaming of re-winning the hand of his former fiancée (Jana), who has moved on to another man whose prospects seem better.  He spends his off hours surreptitiously observing a female neighbor.

His parents also face personal problems: his mother has involved herself in causes promoting world peace but ignores her collapsing family; his father is fighting a midlife crisis by trying to pursue an extramarital affair with a colleague.

Cast
Ivan Trojan as Petr
Zuzana Šulajová as Jana
Zuzana Stivínová as Jana (voice)
Miroslav Krobot as Otec
Nina Divíšková as Matka
Karel Heřmánek as Šéf
Petra Lustigová as Sylvie
Jiří Bartoška as Jiří
Zuzana Bydžovská as Alice
Jana Hubinská as Teta
Jiří Bábek as Aleš
Marta Sládečková as Šefova žena
Jan Lepšík as Kolega
Matúš Bukovčan as Kolega
Petr Lafek as Martin
Peter Dubecký as Číšník
Ida Sovová as Servírka
Václav Strasser as Dublinář

Awards
2005 Czech Lion Awards: Best sound
2005 Czech Lion Awards: Best supporting actor, Miroslav Krobot
2006, Bronza Rosa Camuna - Best director, Bergamo Film Meeting

References

External links
 

2005 films
2005 comedy-drama films
2005 black comedy films
2000s Czech-language films
Films directed by Petr Zelenka
Czech Lion Awards winners (films)
Adultery in films
Czech black comedy films
Czech comedy-drama films